Color of Success is the 1985 debut album by the funk/R&B singer, Morris Day.

Background
Released a year after departing previous band The Time, the album is similar in style to The Time's material, even going so far as to copy The Time's formula of six songs per album.    The album's highlight is "The Oak Tree", a funky-pop number about a dance, akin to "The Bird" by The Time.  The album was produced, arranged and composed by Day, who also played drums and keyboards throughout the album.  Also on keyboards was Rickey "Freeze" Smith, who would later join Day in the revamped version of The Time in the mid-1990s.

Track listing
All tracks composed by Morris Day
 "Color of Success"  – 5:20
 "The Character"  – 4:07
 "The Oak Tree"  – 7:22
 "Love Sign"  – 6:22
 "Don't Wait For Me"  – 7:12
 "Love / Addiction"  – 5:10

Personnel
Drums and Percussion - Morris Day
Drum Programming - Steve Mitchell
Engineer - Richard Kaplan
Guitar - Horace Bokie Coleman Jr., Howie Rice, Roland Bautista, Tony Berg
Mixing - Michael Brauer, Morris Day
Piano - Greg Phillinganes
Producer - Morris Day
Synthesizer - Howie Rice, Larry Dunn, Morris Day, Ricky "Freeze" Smith, Steve Mitchell
Vocals - Morris Day (lead), Angie Johnson, Bunny Hull, Clydene Jackson, Kit Hain, Mary Bridges, Maxayne Lewis, Mimi Brodsky, Sharon Robinson

Charts

References

Morris Day albums
1985 debut albums
Warner Records albums